Faded Love may refer to:

 (in music)
 "Faded Love", a 1950 song by Bob Wills
 Faded Love, a 1988 music album by Patsy Cline
 "Faded Love", a 2004 song by pre)Thing from 22nd Century Lifestyle
 "Faded Love", a 2018 song by Tinashe
 "Faded Love", a 2021 song by Leony
 (in literature)
 Faded Love (1986), the fifth novel of the Hank the Cowdog series by John R. Erickson